Leptoperla cacuminis is a species of stonefly in the family Gripopterygidae. It is endemic to Australia.

References

Plecoptera
Insects of Australia
Vulnerable fauna of Australia
Taxonomy articles created by Polbot
Aquatic insects